Jane, Duchess of Gordon was launched in 1805 as an East Indiaman for the British East India Company (EIC). She made one complete voyage for the EIC and then foundered while homeward bound on the second.

History
EIC voyage #1 (1805-1807): Captain John Cameron acquired a letter of marque on 18 March 1805. He sailed from Portsmouth on 10 August 1805, bound for Madras and Bengal. Jane, Duchess of Gordon was at Cork on 14 August, Madeira on 29 September, and St. Salvadore on 10 November.

Jane Duchess of Gordon was one of the EIC vessels that were part of the expedition under General Sir David Baird and Admiral Sir Home Riggs Popham that would in 1806 capture the Dutch Cape Colony. They would carry supplies and troops to the Cape, and then continue on their voyages.

 

Jane Duchess of Gordon arrived at the Cape of Good Hope on 4 January 1806.

After Dutch Governor Jansens signed a capitulation on 18 January 1806, and the British established control of the Cape Colony,  escorted William Pitt, Jane Duchess of Gordon, Sir William Pulteney, and Comet to Madras. The convoy included Northampton, Streatham, Europe, Union, Glory, and Sarah Christiana.

Jane, Duchess of Gordon reached Madras on 17 April.

At Madras, the captains of the eight East Indiamen in the convoy joined together to present Captain George Byng, of Belliqueux, a piece of silver plate worth £100 as a token of appreciation for his conduct while they were under his orders. Byng wrote his thank you letter to them on 24 April.

Jane, Duchess of Gordon arrived at Diamond Harbour on 21 June. Homeward bound, she was at Saugor on 4 September, Madras on 9 October, and the Cape on 30 December. She reached St Helena on 23 January 1807 and arrived at The Downs on 12 April.

EIC voyage #2 (1808-loss): Captain Cameron sailed from Portsmouth on 8 May 1808, bound for Ceylon and Bengal. Leopard provided the escort for the convoy of East Indiamen.

They were never heard of again. The hull of one of them was sighted overturned off Mauritius the following October, but sank before it could be identified. 

The EIC valued the cargo it lost on Jane, Duchess of Gordon, at £86,089.

Citations and references
Citations

References

Reports from the Select Committee of the House of Commons appointed to enquire into the present state of the affairs of the East India Company, together with the minutes of evidence, an appendix of documents, and a general index,  (1830).

1805 ships
Ships built on the River Thames
Ships of the British East India Company
Age of Sail merchant ships of England
Maritime incidents in 1809
Missing ships
Ships lost with all hands
Shipwrecks in the Indian Ocean